Dana County (Lurish: شݴرستانی دنا ) is in Kohgiluyeh and Boyer-Ahmad province, Iran. The capital of the county is the city of Sisakht. At the 2006 census, the county's population was 52,242 in 11,117 households. The following census in 2011 counted 52,040 people in 12,835 households. At the 2016 census, the county's population was 42,539 in 11,706 households, by which time Kabgian District had been separated from the county to join Boyer-Ahmad County.

Geography 
Dena County is located in the north of Kohgiluyeh and Boyer-Ahmad provinces and has an area of 1821 square kilometers. This county is limited to Semirom County in Isfahan province and Lordegan County from the north and Boyer-Ahmad County from the south.

The main water resources of Dena County are: Kabkian river, Khorsan river, Tang Potak river, Diashm river, Korea village, Bahram Beigi and Shebliz rivers, Meymand waterfall, as well as a number of seasonal and permanent waterfalls called Bahram Beigi waterfall, Manj and Dudrak Korea, Nari valley and Tuf Shah is flowing in this city.
The important heights of this city are: Dena or Dinar peak with a height of 4409 meters, which is the ninth highest peak in Iran and every year a large number of mountaineers from all over the country and other parts of the world enter the city of Sisakht to conquer it and other neighboring peaks. Other important heights of this city include the heights of Shorum, Siouk Mountain and Siah Kooh.

Administrative divisions

The population history and structural changes of Dana County's administrative divisions over three consecutive censuses are shown in the following table. The latest census shows two districts, four rural districts, and two cities.

References

 

Counties of Kohgiluyeh and Boyer-Ahmad Province